The Murder of Bob Chappell occurred on 26 January 2009 in Hobart in Tasmania. Robert Adrian Chappell, the de facto partner of Susan Blyth "Sue" Neill-Fraser, disappeared from their yacht, Four Winds. Neill-Fraser was found guilty of his murder in 2010.  Various appeals have all been dismissed.

Background 
Bob Chappell (65), a radiation oncology medical physicist from Hobart, and his partner of 18 years, Susan Neill-Fraser (born 3 March 1954), were the owners of a 16-metre (53 foot) ketch called Four Winds. The ship had been purchased in Queensland in September 2008 and had been brought to Hobart in December 2008. From about 9am on 26 January 2009, Chappell was on the yacht while it was moored in the River Derwent off Marieville Esplanade, Sandy Bay for the purpose of working on it. Neill-Fraser was with him for a short time in the morning and returned at about 2pm, using the yacht's tender, a white inflatable dinghy. Later in the afternoon she returned to the shore in the tender, while Chappell remained on the yacht. The court found Sue returned to the shoreline and out to the yacht later in the evening.

The Investigation

The dinghy 
Between 11:30pm and midnight on 26 January, witness John Hughes was parked at the end of rowing sheds at Marieville Esplanade when he saw and heard an inflatable dinghy with an outboard on the back coming from the direction of the Royal Yacht Club, heading northeast towards the Eastern Shore of the Derwent, roughly towards Four Winds. Hughes said that there was only one person in it who had the outline of a female, but he could not be definite.

At about 5:40am the next day, a different witness found the dinghy bobbing against rocks. The witness secured it. With another man, he headed out in a boat. As they passed Four Winds, they noticed that it was very low in the water on its mooring. They boarded it. Shortly after, members of Tasmania Police arrived as a result of a call.

Police board Four Winds and search for Chappell 
When police boarded Four Winds that morning they noticed blood on steps, a knife on the floor of the wheelhouse and a torch with blood on it. There was no trace of Chappell. The yacht was low in the water and sinking. The causes were located. A pipe to the for'ard toilet had been cut allowing seawater to flow in. It was also discovered that a seacock under the flooring in the for'ard part of the yacht had been opened, allowing seawater to flow in.
 
Police experienced in marine and rescue services and with water craft took the view that the person responsible for cutting the pipe and opening the seacock had an intimate knowledge of Four Winds, particularly in the case of the seacock, which was under a carpet and panel, and which served no apparent purpose.
 
Divers searched an area around Four Winds and to the south of it. Because of poor visibility, it was impossible for the divers to find objects on the bottom. As a consequence, sonar equipment was used in April 2009 to search roughly the same area. Ninety items of interest were located with the sonar. Only 25 of them were dived on. They were not the body of Chappell.
 
 After water had been pumped from it, Four Winds was towed to Constitution Dock on 27 January. At about 4:30pm, Neill-Fraser and others went on board. The appellant pointed out a number of anomalies on the yacht. She said that a green rope on the starboard side was in disarray and out of place. She pointed out that a winch handle was in the winch on the main mast and said that it should not have been there. She said that a rope around the winch had been cut and also another rope in a pile on the deck. In the main saloon area she pointed out that a fire extinguisher was missing from a bracket. She also pointed out that an EPIRB was missing from a bracket mounted on the back of the wheelhouse.

Forensic testing of Four Winds and dinghy 
The inflatable dinghy had many areas that were positive to luminol, a screening test for blood but not a conclusive one.

On 28 January 2009 the yacht was moved to the premises of Cleanlift Marine at Goodwood and was placed on a slip for inspection. In the following days, a great number of items, samples and swabs were collected, and many were forensically examined or analysed. One was a swab taken on about 30 January 2009 9.45 metres from the bow of the yacht on the starboard walkway, while it was at Goodwood.
 
The swab was taken because at that point a luminol test was positive, although it ultimately proved negative for blood. DNA analysis of the swab revealed a full DNA profile of a then-unknown female. It did not match the DNA of any individual on the Tasmanian DNA database. Statistically there was a less than one in one hundred million chance that the DNA profile of more than one person, unrelated to each other, would have matched it. There was no evidence establishing how that DNA profile came to be in a substance on the deck of the yacht on 30 January 2009.

The accounts given by Neill-Fraser

The 28 January 2009 Declaration 
On 28 January 2009 Neill-Fraser made a statutory declaration in which she said that after tying up the dinghy at the Royal Yacht Club she went to Bunnings Warehouse for a long time, although she did not buy anything, just browsed. It was starting to get dark when she arrived home. She mentioned the telephone calls she made and received and said she got off the telephone at 10:30pm. That accorded with records. She said that she stayed alone at home that night and that the following morning she was notified the yacht was sinking. She made no mention of travelling to Marieville Esplanade after 10:30pm.

The 5 February 2009 discussion with police 
On 5 February 2009, she told Constable Marissa Milazzo and Detective Senior Constable Shane Sinnitt that after she left Four Winds on 26 January she went straight out to Bunnings. She said she drove in, turned left and parked facing the building, arriving at roughly 4:40pm at the main entrance near the checkouts. She said there was always someone at the door and that she was wearing a cream brimmed hat, beige shorts, joggers and sunglasses. She said she looked at timber and slip mats, turned right and looked at the paint section. She went up just about every aisle and left by the same entrance.

The 4 March 2009 police interview 
When interviewed by police on 4 March 2009, she continued to maintain that she drove to Bunnings from the Yacht Club. She said she remembered feeling guilty when doing so because she thought that if the deceased telephoned her, he had her mobile and she was not at home. However, she was aware that police had examined CCTV footage at Bunnings and could not find her on it and retreated to claiming that she was "pretty sure" she had gone there. She was told that Bunnings shut that day at 6pm, which made it unlikely that she could have been there for “hours” as she had previously claimed.
 
Later in that interview she maintained that she did not leave her home on the night of 26 January after receiving the telephone call from Richard King.

The 8 or 10 March 2009 telephone call 
Chappell's sister Caroline Sanchez gave evidence that on either 8 or 10 March 2009, she had a telephone conversation with Neill-Fraser, in the course of which Neill-Fraser told her that on the night of 26 January she was disturbed or anxious about the content of the telephone call from Richard King and had driven down to Sandy Bay, looked across at the yacht, but it was in darkness, and then drove back. That was the first occasion upon which the appellant had admitted to returning to Marieville Esplanade that night.

The 13 March 2009 ABC interview 
On 13 March 2009, she was interviewed by an ABC journalist, Felicity Ogilvie. She told Ogilvie that after the telephone call from King she drove down to the boat to check that everything was okay, did not see anything going on at the yacht and drove home. She added that she saw homeless people with fires while down there. Ogilvie later provided that information to police. It was the first time they were aware that the appellant had returned to Marieville Esplanade on the night in question.

The 23 March 2009 telephone call 
On 23 March 2009, Caroline Sanchez had another telephone conversation with Neill-Fraser in which the appellant said that although she had driven down to Marieville Esplanade that night, she left the car there and walked back home to West Hobart for the exercise. It was the first time she said she had left the car at Marieville Esplanade.

The 5 May 2009 police interview 
Police interviewed her again on 5 May 2009. Asked about what she had done on the afternoon of 26 January after going out to Four Winds, she said that she had been mistaken about going to Bunnings, claiming that she had mixed up the day with another day a few days earlier when she had left the deceased on board the yacht and gone to the store.
 
During the same interview, she said she had been on the yacht on the afternoon of 26 January until later than she had previously indicated, and after tying the dinghy at the Royal Yacht Club, she walked back to Allison Street, West Hobart, leaving the car on Marieville Esplanade or around the corner in Margaret Street, she could not remember which. She said she did not remember whether it was daylight or dark. After the telephone call from King, the content of which had unnerved her, she decided to collect the car and drive it home so that it would be available to her to drive to the yacht if the deceased called her. She decided not to telephone him because having regard to the lateness of the hour, he might be asleep. So she walked to the car at or near Marieville Esplanade. However, on arriving there she found she had farm keys and not the car keys and had to walk back to Allison Street to collect them and return once again to the car. She then drove along to the rowing sheds, which was the only place from which the boat could be seen properly. She got out, walked down to the beach and saw a fire going and homeless people there. She could not see the boat because it was pitch black. She felt a lot better for having gone there. She then drove home.
 
In that interview, Neill-Fraser was told that the red jacket police had shown her on the morning of 27 January was in fact hers because it contained her DNA. She conceded it was hers and said she had no idea how it came to be on the fence in Margaret Street.

Laying of the murder charge 
On 20 August 2009, Neill-Fraser returned home from a consultation with her family lawyer, to find police at her home, waiting to arrest her. She was then arrested and was charged with murder.

Sample matched to Meaghan Vass 
On 15 March 2010, when legal proceedings were underway, the DNA profile of the then-unknown female from the bow of the yacht on the starboard walkway was matched with the DNA profile of one Meaghan Vass. A sample had been taken from her by police for reasons unconnected with this case.

Trial 
 The trial commenced in August 2010 before then-Justice Alan Blow in the Criminal Court of the Supreme Court of Tasmania. Tim Ellis SC and Jack Shapiro appeared for the State of Tasmania. David Gunson SC and Louise Brooks appeared for Neill-Fraser. During the trial it emerged that police had bugged Neill-Fraser's home and obtained some 768 hours’ worth of recordings, none of which was played to the court.

Detective Shane Sinnitt admitted that police had not followed up the possibility that a grey dinghy, different from the blue and white dinghy owned by Neill-Fraser, had been seen heading in the direction of Four Winds on 26 January 2009.

Vass on the Basha inquiry 
During the course of the trial, it was established that Meaghan Vass had been 15 years old on 26 January 2009. She had been homeless since she was 13. Having discovered the matching profiles, police first spoke to her with a view to interviewing her, to see if she had any connection with the death of the deceased. She declined to be interviewed. In cross-examination her explanation was that she felt intimidated and that she had "just never dealt with something this large before".
 
As it was not possible to provide a statement of the evidence she would give before the jury, what has come to be known as a Basha inquiry was conducted in the absence of the jury. Its purpose was to determine what she was likely to say or not say in evidence before the jury.
 
In her evidence-in-chief in the course of the Basha inquiry, she said she was living in Hobart in early 2009, that she had never been aboard Four Winds, she did not remember if she went to the area of Constitution Dock in January and February 2009, and she did not remember going to an area of Goodwood near Negara Crescent where there was an industrial estate and some yachts in January 2009. She was briefly cross-examined. First, she was asked where she was living in January 2009. She said she was "pretty sure" she was living at a Montrose women's shelter, which she named. The appellant's counsel asked: "Pretty sure?" She answered: "Yes, I can't really remember, I'm sorry". She said she had no occupation at the time and received a special benefit. She confirmed that she had never been on board Four Winds and she had no memory of being in the wharf area of Constitution Dock and seeing the yacht there. She agreed with defence counsel that the wharf area was not an area she would go to in late January 2009, and that it was highly unlikely she was around Constitution Dock on about 27 or 28 January 2009. She confirmed she had no memory of going to a shipyard in Negara Crescent, Goodwood called Cleanlift Marine and agreed that she had never been there in her life.

Vass before the jury 
Immediately after, Vass gave evidence in the presence of the jury. Her evidence-in-chief was brief once again. She said she did not remember ever being on the yacht, being in the Constitution Dock area at the end of January or the very beginning of February 2009, or being at that time in the area of Negara Crescent, Goodwood where there were some yachts on slips and an industrial estate. She was cross-examined again. She said she did not have a twin sister and gave her reason for not being interviewed by police. She said she was quite sure she had never been on the yacht. Her evidence concluded with testimony that she had never been to the industrial premises called Cleanlift Marine at Negara Crescent at Goodwood, and most definitely was not there in late January or early February 2009.

The application to recall Vass 
On the day after Vass gave evidence, Gunson SC applied to have her recalled as a witness. Since she had given evidence, counsel had received information that Detective Sinnitt had been informed by a member of staff at a women's shelter in New Town that Vass was listed as a person who would be staying there on the evening of 26 January 2009, but she had told the staff that she wanted to sleep over at Unit 8 at an address she gave at Mount Nelson. The information was that she left the New Town shelter at 3:50pm with an arrangement that she would telephone later with the telephone number of the person with whom she would be staying at Mount Nelson, but she failed to do so.
 
Ellis SC refused to recall her, and the trial judge declined to take any step to compel her attendance.

The State's closing argument 
The Crown case concluded after three weeks. In closing arguments, Ellis SC argued that:
 
It made no sense, and it was not a reasonable possibility, that a stranger or strangers to the deceased not only killed him but in addition removed his body from the scene by using a winch. It was argued that the person who cut the pipe to the for'ard toilet and opened the seacock under the floor must have had an intimate knowledge of the yacht and was not a stranger to it. The jury's attention was drawn to the evidence that the appellant had that knowledge.
It was too much of a coincidence for a stranger to have not only boarded the yacht and killed the deceased, but in addition to have used the yacht's tender to enable those things to be done, a tender which the appellant said she had left tied up to a ladder at the yacht club. It was argued that the use of a winch to remove the body of the 64 kilogram deceased was more consistent with one person being involved rather than several.
The evidence showed that there was an attempt to clean up the scene of the killing and that a stranger would not have done that. Counsel for the Crown was referring to the evidence that carpet tiles in front of the electrical panel, where the appellant said the deceased was working that day, had been taken up after first unscrewing feet from stairs that were on top of the tiles.
The jury could infer that the appellant had killed the deceased and left his body on the yacht when she went home in the evening and commenced to make and receive telephone calls at 9:17pm. It was argued that the telephone call from Richard King unnerved her because he had wanted to speak to the deceased and instead learned that he was not available. As a result, it was argued, the appellant went to the boat to dispose of the body and clean up incriminating evidence. It was pointed out that the evidence of Hughes assisted a finding that the appellant used the dinghy to return to the yacht at about 11:30pm to midnight, and that the evidence of the *10# call at 3:08am was consistent with her having just returned home and checking who might have telephoned while she was out.
In the days and months following the killing of the deceased, the appellant told a great number of lies concerning her movements that day and night, in the course of which she kept changing her position, and that the jury should conclude that they were told out of a consciousness of guilt, knowing that the truth would reveal it.

Verdict 
On 15 October 2010, Neill-Fraser was found guilty by unanimous verdict.

Penalty phase 
On 27 October 2010 Neill-Fraser was sentenced to 26 years’ imprisonment with a non-parole period of 18 years for the murder of Bob Chappell.
 
In sentencing Neill-Fraser, Justice Blow said:

Appellate proceedings

First appeal 
An appeal against the conviction and sentence to the Court of Criminal Appeal was heard on 11 August 2011. Michael Croucher SC appeared for Neill-Fraser, and Tim Ellis and Jack Shapiro appeared for the State of Tasmania.
 
One of the grounds of appeal related to the failure to recall Meaghan Vass for further cross-examination by defence counsel. It was specifically argued that the fact that the DNA profile from the yacht matched that of Vass raised two possibilities in support of the defence case. One was that she was on the yacht at or about the time of the death of the deceased and was responsible for it, or had personal knowledge of facts material to a determination of who was responsible. The other was that she was responsible for, or a party to, a break-in on the yacht on 10 January 2009, which the appellant claimed had taken place. The Court noted that Gunson SC had, at trial, the opportunity to ask Vass questions that directly related to those two possibilities when he cross-examined her, but that the only question of that kind asked of her was: "Are you quite sure you've never been on board this boat?" The Court of Criminal Appeal rejected the argument that a miscarriage of justice had occurred as a result of the failure to recall Vass.
 
Other technical grounds of appeal against conviction relating to the directions given by Justice Blow to the jury were also dismissed. In respect of the appeal against sentence, the Court upheld the appeal on the basis that the sentence was manifestly excessive, and substituted a sentence of 23 years' imprisonment from 20 August 2009, with a non-parole period of 13 years.

High Court special leave application 
A special leave application in respect of the conviction to the High Court of Australia was heard and refused on 7 September 2012.

Second appeal (leave to appeal) 
Following an amendment to the Criminal Code Act 1924, Neill-Fraser was allowed to seek leave for a second appeal on the basis of “fresh and compelling evidence”.
 
During the leave application, Tom Percy QC for Neill-Fraser argued that since the trial, Meaghan Vass had in 2017 made a statutory declaration to the effect that her evidence at trial was false, that she had been aboard Four Winds on 26 January 2009 with others whom she was scared to name, and that Neill-Fraser was not present.  
 
When the Court came to receive sworn evidence from Meaghan Vass on the appeal, she denied ever having been on Four Winds on Australia Day or at any other time, and could provide no explanation as to how DNA matching hers was found on the yacht.
 
During the hearing of the appeal it was alleged by the State of Tasmania that a former detective, Colin McLaren, had fabricated the statutory declaration and had come up with a plan to pay Vass $10,000 for adopting the declaration.  It was also alleged that Neill-Fraser herself had attempted to cause Vass to sack her then solicitor, Fabiano Cangelosi, because Cangelosi was expected to ask Vass whether the statutory declaration was the product of coercion.
 
The court also heard from forensic expert Maxwell Jones, who testified that the DNA match to Vass was likely the result of a primary deposit of her biological fluid, and not from a momentary touch or a secondary transfer.
 
After the court had adjourned to consider its decision on the leave application, Vass gave an interview with Nine Network's 60 Minutes, in which she admitted detailed knowledge of events on the yacht apparently leading to the death of Chappell. The airing of the interview was followed by an application to reopen Neill-Fraser's case, which was granted, with a further affidavit from Vass being read into evidence. The affidavit deposed that Vass was present on the yacht with two identified male companions. She witnessed at least one of the males assault Chappell. She recalled seeing a lot of blood, and could not recall leaving the yacht or what happened after the assault. Justice Helen Wood later ordered that the Nine Network deliver up to Neill-Fraser's solicitors all video footage, including material not used when Vass’ interview went to air.
 
As a consequence of a further police investigation prior to the hearing of the leave application, three other persons were charged with offences connected with the obtaining of evidence exculpatory of Neill-Fraser. Solicitor Jeffrey Thompson was charged with perverting the course of justice as a result of a photoboard identification procedure conducted by him with a potential eyewitness, Stephen Gleeson. Stephen Gleeson himself was charged with two counts of perverting the course of justice and pleaded guilty, receiving a sentence of 12 months imprisonment, without parole for 6 months. Karen Keefe was charged with two charges of perverting the course of justice and one of corrupting a witness. Police alleged that she provided false evidence in an affidavit as part of Neill-Fraser's appeal, agreeing to accept nearly $100,000 in return for an understanding another witness would give false evidence. Thompson was later discharged from all proceedings against him, as a result of a pretrial ruling by Justice Michael Brett.
 
On 21 March 2019, Neill-Fraser succeeded in obtaining leave to appeal. In granting leave, the Court said:

Second appeal (determination of the second appeal) 
Following disruptions due to COVID-19, the determination of the second appeal was set down for 1 March 2021. On 24 February 2021 it was announced that Tom Percy QC was no longer leading counsel for Neill-Fraser, and that prominent Melbourne barrister, Robert Richter QC, would lead Neill-Fraser's legal team.

During her evidence in chief on 1 March, Vass testified that she had got on board Four Winds with her then-boyfriend, teenager Samuel Devine, whom she accused of having killed Bob Chappell: “Bob had told Sam and that to get off the boat, ‘what are you doing?’ ... That's when Samuel started flipping, got a bit angry, and lashed out. All I remember was seeing a lot of blood and arguing for about 30 minutes.”

Under cross-examination by Director of Public Prosecutions, Darryl Coates SC, Vass conceded that she had never even been on Four Winds at all, and alleged that she had been continually harassed since 2016 to testify and exonerate Neill-Fraser. The recanting of her evidence drew an admission from Richter that “We are in a situation in which we agree that the evidence of Vass cannot support the motion of fresh and compelling evidence leading to a miscarriage of justice... We do not abandon the notion of the DNA evidence of being capable of providing the evidence for this court to say there has been a miscarriage of justice.”

The hearing of the appeal concluded on 3 March 2021 with evidence relating to the DNA sample matching Vass, including the likelihood of the sample having been deposited otherwise than by Ms Vass’ presence on Four Winds. The Court reserved its decision.

On 30 November 2021, the Court handed down its decision, with Justices Helen Wood and Robert Pearce dismissing the appeal by majority. Justice Stephen Estcourt dissented, finding that there had occurred a substantial miscarriage of justice.

Refusal of special leave to appeal 
On 12 August 2022, the High Court of Australia refused Neill-Fraser's application for special leave to appeal the decision of the Court of Criminal Appeal dismissing the second appeal.

Political concerns 
On 30 August 2021 Mike Gaffney MLC for Mersey tabled a series documents in Parliament that he said illustrated Neill-Fraser was denied justice because of an inadequate police investigation and false evidence put before the jury:

"We have all had the benefit of a full expose, the results of years of RTI requests, the seeking of expert advice and detailed forensic analysis… Mr President, our courts have been misled, a woman has been incarcerated for 12 years as a consequence.”

Parole 
On 16 September 2022, it was announced that the Parole Board of Tasmania had granted Neill-Fraser parole. Neill-Fraser was released on the morning of 4 October 2022.

In the media 
In 2013, psychologist and film producer Eve Ash produced a documentary called Shadow of Doubt about the conviction of Neill-Fraser, which was later nominated for best feature documentary at the AACTA Awards. 

The murder is also the subject of a 21-episode investigative true crime podcast called Who Killed Bob?. The podcast was hosted by Ash and former homicide task force detective Colin McLaren.

See also
List of people who disappeared mysteriously at sea

References

2000s in Tasmania
2000s missing person cases
2009 murders in Australia
Deaths by person in Australia
Male murder victims
Missing person cases in Australia
Murder convictions without a body
Murder in Tasmania
People who died at sea